William Craven, 1st Earl of Craven, PC (June 1608 – 9 April 1697) was an English nobleman and soldier.

His parents were William Craven, born in a poor family in Appletreewick in North Yorkshire, who moved to London, became wealthy, and was Lord Mayor of London in 1610, and Elizabeth (née Whitmore), sister of George Whitmore, a later Lord Mayor of London. Their other children included John Craven, 1st Baron Craven of Ryton, 

Mary, who married Thomas Coventry, 2nd Baron Coventry and Elizabeth, who married Percy Herbert, 2nd Baron Powis.

Craven matriculated at Trinity College, Oxford in 1623, aged 15, and was created M.A. in 1636.

During the Thirty Years' War Craven fought for Frederick V on the Continent. At the siege of Bad Kreuznach in March 1632, he fought with such courage that King Gustavus Adolphus of Sweden patted him on the shoulder; he was also seriously wounded. 

At the Battle of Vlotho Bridge in October 1638, he was captured and later ransomed for £20,000. Craven also fell in love with the unfortunate Queen Elizabeth of Bohemia, a British princess. Still being absent during the English Civil War, he supported this lady's brother, Charles I, financially rather than in person and, therefore, had all his lands – largely in Berkshire, but including his main country seat at Caversham Park in Oxfordshire – confiscated. After the Restoration, he set about planning to build a vast palace for Elizabeth at Hamstead Marshall in Berkshire with a hunting lodge at nearby Ashdown (now in Oxfordshire), but she died before construction of the palace began. Perhaps because of his devotion to Elizabeth, he never married.

After the Restoration, he was rewarded with several Court offices and given an earldom. He was granted a share in the Colony of Carolina and served as one of its Lords Proprietors. Craven County, North Carolina is named for him. As a Privy Councillor, he seems to have been diligent enough: Samuel Pepys in his Diary regularly mentions his attendance at the committee for Tangier and his chairing of the Committee on Fisheries. In the latter role Pepys was rather shocked by his bawdy language which Pepys thought improper in a councillor (though perhaps natural in an old soldier). In 1678, we read of his presence at the historic Council meeting where Titus Oates first publicised the Popish Plot.

Pepys's attitude to Craven varies in the Diary – on the one hand, he calls him a coxcomb and criticises his chairing of the Fisheries Committee; at other times he is glad that Craven is his "very good friend".

Whatever Pepys's opinion of him, Craven earned the lasting respect and gratitude of the people of London during the Great Plague of 1665 when, unlike the great majority of noblemen, who fled to the country, he remained in London, helping to maintain order and donating property for burial grounds.

During the Glorious Revolution, on the evening of December 17, 1688, Craven, as colonel of the Coldstream Guards, was on guard duty with his soldiers, protecting King James II at Whitehall Palace, when Hendrik Trajectinus, Count of Solms, commanding three battalions loyal to the Prince of Orange, came to take military possession of the surroundings of the palace.  Craven swore that he would be cut to pieces rather than submit, but James, when he heard what was happening, ordered Craven to withdraw.

Craven died on 9 April 1697 aged 88 in London.

References
Ford, David Nash (2001). Royal Berkshire History: William Craven, Earl of Craven (1608–1697)

Further reading

 

1608 births
1697 deaths
Alumni of Trinity College, Oxford
British colonial heads of the Bahamas
Coldstream Guards officers
William
Earls in the Peerage of England
Peers of England created by Charles I
Lord-Lieutenants of Middlesex
Lords Proprietors of Carolina
Members of the Privy Council of England
People from Hamstead Marshall
Earls of Craven